Prodi is a surname. Notable people with the surname include:
 Giovanni Prodi (1925–2010), Italian mathematician
 Giorgio Prodi (1928–1987), Italian medical scientist, oncologist, and semiotician
 Paolo Prodi (1932–2016), Italian historian and politician
 Romano Prodi (born 1939), Italian politician and statesman
 Vittorio Prodi (born 1937), Italian politician

Italian-language surnames